The 2018 NCAA Division I Football Championship Game was a postseason college football game that determined a national champion in the NCAA Division I Football Championship Subdivision for the 2017 season. It was played at Toyota Stadium in Frisco, Texas, on January 6, 2018, with kickoff at 12:00 noon EST, and was the culminating game of the 2017 FCS Playoffs. With sponsorship from Northwestern Mutual, the game was officially known as the NCAA FCS Football Championship Presented by Northwestern Mutual.

Teams
The participants of the 2018 NCAA Division I Football Championship Game were the finalists of the 2017 FCS Playoffs, which began with a 24-team bracket. No. 1 seed James Madison and No. 2 seed North Dakota State qualified for the final by winning their semifinal games. James Madison was the designated home team for the final game.

North Dakota State Bison

North Dakota State finished their regular season with a 10–1 record (7–1 in conference). Their one loss was to South Dakota State, 33–21. In the FCS playoffs, they defeated San Diego, Wofford, and Sam Houston State to reach the finals. The Bison entered the championship game with a 5–0 record in prior FCS finals, occurring consecutively in the 2011 through 2015 seasons.

James Madison Dukes

James Madison finished their regular season with an 11–0 record (8–0 in conference). In the FCS playoffs, they defeated Stony Brook, Weber State, and South Dakota State to reach the finals. The Dukes entered the championship game with a 2–0 record in prior FCS/Division I-AA finals, having defeated Montana for the 2004 season title, and Youngstown State for the 2016 season title.

Game summary

Scoring summary

Game statistics

References

Further reading

External links
Box score at ESPN
North Dakota State vs James Madison via YouTube

Championship Game
NCAA Division I Football Championship Games
James Madison Dukes football games
North Dakota State Bison football games
American football in the Dallas–Fort Worth metroplex
Sports in Frisco, Texas
NCAA Division I Football Championship Game
NCAA Division I Football Championship Game